The Chita State Academy of Medicine  is an institution of higher education in Chita, Russia. It was founded on 23 July 1953 as the Chita State Institute of Medicine. The institute was composed of the lecturers of the Perm Dentist Institute evacuated to Chita during World War II.

Following the collapse of the Soviet Union, the Chita State Institute of Medicine was renamed in 1995 when it was granted the new status becoming the Chita State Academy of Medicine.

External links

 

Universities in Zabaykalsky Krai
Universities and institutes established in the Soviet Union
Educational institutions established in 1953
Chita, Zabaykalsky Krai
1953 establishments in Russia
Medical schools in Russia
Public universities and colleges in Russia
Public medical universities